Loni Uhila (born 7 April 1989 in Tonga) is a Tongan rugby union player and professional heavyweight boxer. His nickname called "The Tongan Bear". He plays in the prop position for the provincial based ITM Cup side Waikato. Uhila also plays for Super Rugby franchise, the Hurricanes.

In October 2017, he will join French reigning champions ASM Clermont Auvergne on a one-year contract.

Professional boxing record

| style="text-align:center;" colspan="8"|1 Wins (0 knockouts, 1 decisions), 1 Losses, 0 Draws
|-  style="text-align:center; background:#e3e3e3;"
|  style="border-style:none none solid solid; "|Res.
|  style="border-style:none none solid solid; "|Record
|  style="border-style:none none solid solid; "|Opponent
|  style="border-style:none none solid solid; "|Type
|  style="border-style:none none solid solid; "|Rd., Time
|  style="border-style:none none solid solid; "|Date
|  style="border-style:none none solid solid; "|Location
|  style="border-style:none none solid solid; "|Notes
|- align=center
|Win
|1–1
|align=left| David Letele
|
|
|
|align=left|
|align=left|
|- align=center
|Loss
|0–1
|align=left| David Letele
|
|
|
|align=left|
|align=left|

Personal 
Uhila is married and has a five-year-old daughter, Lile.

Uhila states family is the reason he plays rugby.

References

External links
 itsrugby.co.uk profile

1989 births
New Zealand rugby union players
Rugby union props
Living people
Waikato rugby union players
People educated at Sacred Heart College, Auckland
Hurricanes (rugby union) players